Kevin Mitchell Harmse (born July 4, 1984) is a South African-born Canadian soccer player.

Club career

Youth years
Born in Johannesburg, Harmse grew up in Vancouver, British Columbia, and began his youth career training at the Roman Tulis School in Coquitlam, British Columbia.

Europe
Harmse was drafted by the Vancouver Whitecaps in 2002 but did not sign with the club; instead, after training with both Bayern Munich and Benfica he signed with Tromsø IL in the Norwegian Premier League. He did not see much playing time, and returned to the Whitecaps in 2004, where he gradually worked himself to become a cornerstone of the defense, playing in 36 games and scoring once.

He signed for Nitra in the Slovakian Corgoň Liga in 2006, spending a year with the club.

Major League Soccer
Harmse returned to North American and signed with Los Angeles Galaxy of Major League Soccer in April 2007. He made his MLS debut on April 12, 2007, coming on at halftime against FC Dallas. He scored his first goal for the club on April 28, 2007, against Chivas USA.

Harmse was traded to Toronto FC in March 2008 for a fourth round draft pick. Harmse was used by the club as a central defender for much of the 2008 and part of the 2009 seasons. He scored his first goal for Toronto FC in the 2009 Nutrilite Canadian Championship opening game against his former team, the Vancouver Whitecaps, on May 6, 2009 at BMO Field.

Harmse was traded to Chivas USA for allocation money on June 24, 2009, but did not feature in any games in his debut season with the team.

On January 21, 2010, Chivas traded Harmse to Houston Dynamo for a conditional third- or fourth-round draft pick in the 2012 MLS SuperDraft.

Due to Harmse not being able to train with the club in pre-season due to a recurring injury, Houston opted to waive him on March 9, 2010.

Harmse was officially signed by Vancouver Whitecaps FC on March 25, 2011, but was waived on June 10, having played in just three MLS games for the club.

On December 13, 2011, it was announced that Harmse signed with the expansion side San Antonio Scorpions of the North American Soccer League.

International career
Harmse played an important part of Canadian U-20 team that made it to the quarterfinals in the 2003 FIFA World Youth Championship. He also played for the U-23 team that failed to qualify for the 2004 Olympics.

He made his debut with the senior Canada national team on March 25, 2007, against Bermuda. By December 2009, he earned a total of 9 caps, scoring no goals. He has represented Canada in 3 FIFA World Cup qualification matches.

Honours

Toronto FC
Canadian Championship (1): 2009

References

External links
 
 
 

1984 births
Living people
Soccer players from Johannesburg
South African emigrants to Canada
Naturalized citizens of Canada
Canadian people of Afrikaner descent
Canadian people of British descent
People from Coquitlam
Association football midfielders
Soccer people from British Columbia
Canadian soccer players
Canada men's international soccer players
2007 CONCACAF Gold Cup players
2009 CONCACAF Gold Cup players
Canadian expatriate soccer players
Canadian expatriate sportspeople in Norway
Canadian expatriate sportspeople in Slovakia
Canadian expatriate sportspeople in the United States
Tromsø IL players
Vancouver Whitecaps (1986–2010) players
FC Nitra players
LA Galaxy players
Toronto FC players
Chivas USA players
San Antonio Scorpions players
A-League (1995–2004) players
USL First Division players
Eliteserien players
Slovak Super Liga players
Major League Soccer players
North American Soccer League players
Expatriate footballers in Norway
Expatriate footballers in Slovakia
Expatriate soccer players in the United States
Vancouver Whitecaps FC players
Canada men's youth international soccer players
Canada men's under-23 international soccer players